ISO/IEC JTC 1/SC 7 Software and systems engineering is a standardization subcommittee of the Joint Technical Committee ISO/IEC JTC 1 of the International Organization for Standardization (ISO) and the International Electrotechnical Commission (IEC), that develops and facilitates standards within the field of engineering of software products and systems. The international secretariat of ISO/IEC JTC 1/SC 7 is the Bureau of Indian Standards (BIS) located in India.

History
ISO/IEC JTC 1/SC 7 was first established in 1987, though the origins of the subcommittee began with ISO/TC 97, established in 1960 as a standardization technical committee in the field of information processing. With the formation of ISO/IEC JTC 1 in 1987, ISO/TC 97 and IEC/TC 83 were combined to form ISO/IEC JTC 1/SC 7, Software Engineering. In 2000, the subcommittee changed its title from Software Engineering to its current title, Software and Systems Engineering. ISO/IEC JTC 1/SC 7 held its first plenary in Paris, France in 1987.

Scope and mission
The scope of ISO/IEC JTC 1/SC 7 is the “Standardization of processes, supporting tools and supporting technologies for the engineering of software products and systems,” including
 Software and systems engineering processes
 Software system products
 Enterprise architecture
 Software engineering environment
 Software engineering body of knowledge
 Management of IT assets

The mission of ISO/IEC JTC 1/SC 7 is to
 Provide quality standards that cover the entire life-cycle of information systems
 Provide quality standards that meet user needs in broad markets
 Manage the set of standards effectively through documented framework
 Promote the use of standards by providing supporting materials
 Provide leadership in standardization through:
 A continuous technology watch process using Study Groups to explore new areas and markets
 The development of a comprehensive set of integrated standards with broad international and professional consensus
 Initiating cooperative work with international professional and standards producing organizations
 A framework that:
 Facilitates the integration and sub-contracting of standards developed in other standards producing organizations
 Facilitates cooperative development of joint standards with other international standards producing organizations
 Minimizes the inconsistencies between ISO/IEC JTC 1/SC 7 standards, including those developed by other standards producing organizations

Structure

As of August 2020, ISO/IEC JTC 1/SC 7 is made up of 14 active working groups (WGs), three ad hoc working groups (AHGs) and five advisory groups (AGs). Each of these groups carries out specific tasks in standards development within the field of systems and software engineering. As a response to standardization needs within the field of software and systems engineering, working groups within ISO/IEC JTC 1/SC 7 were disbanded if their working area was no longer applicable, or established if new working areas arose. The focus of each working group, special working group, advisory group, and task force is described in the group’s terms of reference.

Active working groups of ISO/IEC JTC 1/SC 7 are:

ISO/IEC JTC 1/SC 7 also had one task force, “Spanish Translation Task Force”.

Collaborations
ISO/IEC JTC 1/SC 7 works in close collaboration with a number of other organizations or subcommittees, both internal and external to ISO or IEC, in order to avoid conflicting or duplicative work. Organizations internal to ISO or IEC that collaborate with or are in liaison to ISO/IEC JTC 1/SC 7 include:
 ISO/IEC JTC 1/SC 22, Programming languages, their environments and system software interfaces
 ISO/IEC JTC 1/SC 27, Security techniques
 ISO/IEC JTC 1/SC 32, Data management and interchange
 ISO/IEC JTC 1/SC 38, Cloud Computing and Distributed Platforms
 ISO/IEC JTC 1/SC 40, Service Management and IT Governance
 ISO/TC 22/SC 3, Electrical and electronic equipment
 ISO/TC 22/SC 32, Electrical and electronic components and general system aspects
 ISO/TC 46/SC 4, Technical interoperability
 ISO/TC 159/SC 4, Ergonomics of human-system interaction
 ISO/TC 176, Quality management and quality assurance
 ISO/TC 176/SC 1, Concepts and terminology
 ISO/TC 176/SC 2, Quality systems
 ISO/TC 176/SC 3, Supporting technologies
 ISO/TC 184/SC 4, Industrial data
 ISO/TC 184/SC 5, Interoperability, integration, and architectures for enterprise systems and automation applications
 ISO/TC 210, Quality management and corresponding general aspects for medical devices
 ISO/TC 215, Health informatics
 ISO/PC 251, Asset management
 ISO/TC 258, Project, programme and portfolio management
 ISO/PC 259, Outsourcing
 ISO/CASCO, Committee on conformity assessment
 IEC/TC 56, Dependability
 IEC/TC 93, Design automation

Some organizations external to ISO or IEC that collaborate with or are in liaison to ISO/IEC JTC 1/SC 7 include:
 Audio Engineering Society (AES)
 Ecma International
 Institute of Electrical and Electronics Engineers (IEEE)
 International Council on Systems Engineering (INCOSE)
 Information Systems Audit and Control Association (ISACA/ITGI)
 International Telecommunication Union (ITU)
 Project Management Institute (PMI)
 IT Service Management Forum (itSMF)
 World Meteorological Organization (WMO)
 European Software Institute (ESI software)
 International Association of Information Technology Asset Managers, Inc. (IAITAM)
 The SPICE User Group
 Business Software Alliance (BSA)
 European Telecommunications Standards Institute (ETSI)

Member countries
Countries pay a fee to ISO to be members of subcommittees.

The 40 "P" (participating) members of ISO/IEC JTC 1/SC 7 are: Argentina, Australia, Belgium, Brazil, Canada, China, Costa Rica, Czech Republic, Denmark, Finland, France, Germany, India, Ireland, Israel, Italy, Jamaica, Japan, Kazakhstan, Republic of Korea, Luxembourg, Malaysia, Mexico, Netherlands, New Zealand, Peru, Poland, Portugal, Romania, Russian Federation, Slovakia, South Africa, Spain, Sweden, Switzerland, Thailand, Ukraine, United Kingdom, United States of America, and Uruguay.

The 20 "O" (observing) members of ISO/IEC JTC 1/SC 7 are: Austria, Bosnia and Herzegovina, Chile, Colombia, Cuba, Cyprus, Estonia, Ghana, Hong Kong, Hungary, Iceland, Indonesia, Islamic Republic of Iran, Kenya, Morocco, Norway, Philippines, Serbia, the Republic of Macedonia, and Turkey.

Published standards
ISO/IEC JTC 1/SC 7 currently has 153 published standards within the field of software and systems engineering, including:

See also
 ISO/IEC JTC 1
 List of ISO standards
 Standards Council of Canada
 International Organization for Standardization
 International Electrotechnical Commission

References

External links 
 ISO/IEC JTC 1/SC 7 home page

007
ISO/IEC JTC1/SC7 standards
Systems engineering
Software engineering standards